Chanodichthys abramoides is a species of ray-finned fish in the genus Chanodichthys. This freshwater cyprinid is found in the lower Amur River Basin in Russia and China.

References 

Chanodichthys
Taxa named by Benedykt Dybowski
Fish described in 1872